Euripus Bridge (also Euripos Bridge, Evripos Bridge) is a  cable-stayed bridge located in Chalcis that crosses the Euripus Strait, the central and narrowest part of the channel separating the island of Euboea from the Greek mainland.

Built in 1992, the bridge was the first cable-stayed road bridge in Greece. A technical challenge during the design and the construction phase was the extremely slender (L/480) longitudinally and transversally pre-stressed concrete deck with only  constant thickness, providing sufficient stiffness to omit longitudinal girders. For purpose of higher seismic performance, the concrete deck is monolithically connected with the towers. Constrained reaction due to temperature rise can be handled well due to the slender towers and the soft superstructure. At the transition piers at the bridge ends hinged tension pendulum members are used to transfer uplift forces into the substructure.

Technical data 

 Total length: 
 Main bridge span lengths: 
 Bridge deck width:  (2 carriageways + 2 pedestrian sidewalks)
 Deck surface: 
 Thickness of the concrete deck:

References

Cable-stayed bridges in Greece